Ministry of Rural Development Department Maharashtra is a Ministry of Government of Maharashtra.

The Ministry is currently headed by Girish Mahajan, a Cabinet Minister.

Head office

List of Cabinet Ministers

List of Ministers of State

References

Government ministries of Maharashtra